Clotilde Delbos (born 1967) is a French businesswoman who has been the deputy chief executive officer (CEO) and chief financial officer (CFO) of Renault since 1 January 2021. She was the CEO of Mobilize brand till 2023.

She is notable for taking control of Renault after the unusual circumstances in which two of her predecessors were forced out of the French automobile company. Her immediate predecessor Thierry Bolloré was ousted in a coup and his predecessor Carlos Ghosn was detained in Japan.

Her rise to the top echelons of Renault after the ouster of her predecessor Thierry Bolloré, was described as nothing short of a business coup by the BBC, and a major turning point in the relationship between the two corporate automobile giants Renault and Nissan.

Life 
She is married and has three children.

Education 

She is a graduate of the Emlyon Business School, a leading French business school.

Career 

She started her career in California. She has worked for a number of companies including the French subsidiary of PricewaterhouseCoopers, Pechiney Group, Alcan and Apollo Global Management.

Aluminium industry 

She has worked for a number of companies in the Aluminium Industry including Pechiney Group, Alcan and Constellium.

Banking industry 

Her brief stint in the French banking industry includes positions at RCI Banque, the financial services arm of the Renault company.

She  was appointed as a director of RCI Banque on November 21, 2014, and became a chairman of the Board of Directors of RCI Banque on April 25, 2016.

Renault 

She joined the Groupe Renault in 2012 as Group Controller. In 2014, she was appointed the Alliance Global Director, Control, in addition to her current role as Senior Vice President, Groupe Renault Controller.

In July 2020, Clotilde Delbos became Deputy Chief Executive Officer of Groupe Renault. She is simultaneously the Chief Financial Officer of Groupe Renault and chairman of the Board of Directors of RCI Banque SA.

Awards and accolades 

On 1 December 2020, she was named as the Femme de l’année (in English: Woman of the Year) by the journalists of the business magazine Women and Vehicles in Europe (WAVE).

As one of Renault's most senior executives, she has given a number of interviews and has appeared on a number of magazine covers.

She is only the second female chief executive in the global automobile industry, after Mary Barra, a fact which has been noted by several French business magazines.

References

1967 births
Businesspeople from Nancy, France
Emlyon Business School alumni
Living people
Women chief executives
French women chief executives
Renault people
French chief executives